Serfoji II Bhonsle ( ராஜா போன்ஸ்லே) (24 September 1777 – 7 March 1832) also spelt as Sarabhoji II Bhonsle, was the last ruler of the Bhonsle dynasty of the Maratha principality of Tanjore to exercise absolute sovereignty over his dominions. His descendants, however, have managed to thrive as titular Maharajahs of Thanjavur to the present day. Serfoji belonged to the Bhonsle clan of Marathas and was descended from Chhatrapati Shivaji Maharaj's half-brother Venkoji.  He ruled Thanjavur from 1798 until his death in 1832.

Birth
Serfoji was born on 24 September 1777 in the royal house of the Maratha king, Chattrapati Shivaji. Raja Thulajah, the king of Thanjavur acknowledged him as his son on 23 January 1787 by duly performing all of the religious rites. The boy was entrusted to the care of Rev. Christian Freidrich Schwartz, a Danish missionary.

Difficulties faced in early life
But Thulajah died soon afterwards and his half-brother Amar Singh who had earlier been appointed regent to the boy-king usurped the throne in 1793. Amar Singh denied the young prince the benefits of basic education.

At this juncture, Rev. Schwartz intervened to save the young prince and sent him to Madras where he was educated by Rev. Wilhelm Gericke of the Lutheran Mission. Soon, he became proficient in Tamil, Telugu, Urdu, Sanskrit, French, German, Danish, Greek, Dutch and Latin.

Restoration to the throne
Meanwhile, the British interposed on his behalf and Serfoji ascended the throne of Thanjavur on 29 June 1798. In return for their assistance, Serfoji was forced to cede the administration of the Kingdom to the British and, in return, was granted an annual pension of 100,000 star pagodas and one-fifth of the state's land revenue. Serfoji's sovereignty was restricted to the Fort of Thanjavur and its surrounding areas. Therefore, Serfoji is remembered in history as the last sovereign ruler of Thanjavur.

Reign and administration
 
During Serfoji's reign which lasted from 1798 until his death in 1832, for the first time, the proceedings of the Tanjore durbar were recorded in paper. The Delta region was divided into five districts each under a Subedar Administrative Heads . And created a strong Advisory Board with 6 Intelligent peoples, later who served as administration heads of five divided districts. Cultivable lands yielded good profits and the judiciary system was highly efficient and praiseworthy. 

Serfoji is also credited with having built a lot of chathrams or rest houses for weary pilgrims.  These pilgrims received free boarding and lodging and their needs were taken care of by the State.  In all Serfoji built three important chathrams, including one at Orathanadu.

Contribution to the Sarasvati Mahal Library

The Sarasvati Mahal Library was founded as a Palace Library by the Nayak kings of Thanjavur (1535–1675), it was however Serfoji who enriched it with priceless works, maps, dictionaries, coins and artwork.

The bibliophile that he was, he purchased around 4000 books from different parts of the world and enriched his library with his enormous book collection. Medical treatises, in the library collection contained his remarks alongside, in English. His library included treatises on Vedanta, grammar, music, dance and drama, architecture, astronomy, medicine, training of elephants and horses, etc. Serfoji set up the first Devanagari printing press in South India, using stone letters. He sent many Pundits including Aarur Swai ||ANIRUDRA|| Thyagarajar Iyer  and puthukotai Adhi Nayagam Pillai far and wide and collected huge number of books and manuscripts for this Library.  All the books in the library carry his personal autograph in English.

Apart from these, the Library contains a record of the day-to-day proceedings of the Maratha court known as the Modi documents, French-Maratha correspondence of the 18th century.

The Encyclopædia Britannica in its survey of the libraries of the world mentions this as "perhaps the most remarkable library in India".

The Library is situated in the centre of Nayak palace and it was opened for public in 1918. There is also a small museum there for the visitors.

Educational reforms 
Serfoji founded a school called Navavidhya Kalanidhi Sala where languages, literature, the sciences and arts and crafts were taught in addition to the Vedas and shastras. Serfoji maintained close ties with the Danes at Tarangambadi and visited their schools quite often and appreciated their way of functioning. Impressed, he tried to implement European methods of teachings and education all over his Empire. 

Serfojis is also credited with installing  a hand press with Devanagari type in 1805, the first of its kind in South India. He also established a stone type press called "Nava Vidhya Kalanidhi Varnayanthra Sala".

Civic amenities 
Serfoji constructed ten water tanks and a number of wells for civic use. He implemented an underground drainage system for the whole of Thanjavur city.

Medicine

Serfoji established the Dhanavantari Mahal, a research institution that produced herbal (indigenous medicine) medicine for humans and animals. The institution also treated sick people and maintained case-sheets which have become famous. Here, physicians of modern medicine, ayurveda, unani and siddha schools have performed research upon drugs and herbs for medical cure and had produced eighteen volumes of research material. Serfoji also had the important herbs studied and catalogued in the form of exquisite hand paintings.

Based on the medical prescriptions stored at the Dhanvanthri Mahal, a set of poems were compiled detailing the procedures to cure various diseases. These poems were collected and published as a book, called Sarabhendra Vaidhya Muraigal.

Ophthalmology
In September 2003, during a meeting between Dr. Badrinath and Shivaji Rajah Bhonsle, the current scion of the royal family of Thanjavur and sixth in line from King Serfoji II, the existence of 200-year-old manuscripts in the Saraswathi Mahal library, containing records of the ophthalmic surgical operations believed to have been performed by Prince Serfoji II, came to light Serfoji II regularly carried a surgical kit with him, wherever he went and performed cataract surgeries. Seforji's "operations" have been recorded in detail in English with detailed case histories of the patients he operated. These manuscripts form a part of the collection at the Saraswathi Mahal Library.

Zoological garden
Serfoji created the first Zoological Garden in Tamil Nadu in the Thanjavur palace premises.

Shipping
Serfoji erected a shipyard at Manora, around fifty kilometers from Thanjavur. Serfoji also established a meteorological station to facilitate trade. He had a gun factory, a naval library and a naval store with all kinds of navigational instruments.

Serfoji was also keenly interested in painting, gardening, coin-collecting, martial arts and patronized chariot-racing, hunting and bull-fighting.

Contribution to arts and music
Serfoji was a patron of traditional Indian arts like dance and music. He authored famous works like "Kumarasambhava Champu", "Mudrarakshaschaya" and "Devendra Kuruvanji" and introduced western musical instruments like clarinet and violin in Carnatic Music. Serfoji is also credited with inaugurating and popularising if not inventing the unique Thanjavur style of painting.

Construction and renovation activities
The five story Sarjah Mahadi in the Thanjavur palace and the Manora Fort Tower at Saluvanayakanpattinam were constructed in Serfoji's reign. He installed lightning rods at the top of these monuments and had the history of the Bhonsle Dynasty inscribed on the south-western wall of the Brihadeeswara Temple. It is considered to be the lengthiest inscription in the world. Serfoji also renovated and reconstructed several existing temples like the Brihadeeswara Temple apart from building new ones. He was also an ardent philanthropist and a member of the Royal Asiatic Society.

Pilgrimage to Kasi
In 1820-21, Serfoji embarked on a pilgrimage to Kasi along with a retinue of 3,000 disciples and camp-followers. He encamped at several places along the route, giving away alms to the needy and the poor and engaging himself in acts of charity. He was also involved in the renovation of several holy places. Memories of the pilgrimage have survived to the present day in the paintings of the bathing ghats on the Ganges and the different holy sites commissioned by him.

Religious tolerance
Serfoji was open-minded and tolerant of other faiths. He liberally funded churches and schools run by Christian missionaries. He was also a patron of Thanjavur Bade Hussein Durgah.

Death
Serfoji II died on 7 March 1832 after a reign of almost 40 years (His first reign was from 1787 to 1793 and his second reign was from 1798 to 1832). His death was mourned throughout the empire and his funeral procession was attended by over 90,000 people.

Legacy
In the history of pre-Victorian India, Serfoji's name often pops up at the first instance. He was a great savant and humanist, a man who was far ahead of his times. During his time, Thanjavur was one of the most developed princely states in the Indian subcontinent. While many rajahs were engrossed in fighting and civil wars, Serfoji ushered in an era of peace, prosperity and scientific development and pioneered new administrative and educational reforms. His vision helped Thanjavur forge ahead of other princely states and advance into a new age and emerge as a fitting competitor to European nations. Above all, he was an enlightened and educated soul; the quintessential Indian maharajah of the British colonial era who was at home with both Latin as well as Sanskrit and could converse and compile literary works in both Tamil as well as English. 
At his funeral, a visiting missionary, Rev. Bishop Heber observed:
I have seen many crowned heads, but not one whose deportment was more princely.

Trivia

 Serfoji was a scion of the Bhonsle family from which Chattrapathi Shivaji came. The Maratha kings were the descendants of Shivaji's half-brother, Venkoji.
 Serfoji II is mentioned as Sarabhoji in the Tamil records of the period.
 Serfoji became the last fully independent ruler of Tanjore when, in 1799, the administration of the kingdom was wrested from him by the British immediately after his restoration to the throne leaving the Bhonsles in charge of the fort and the surrounding areas alone. His son Shivaji was the last Thanjavur Marathi ruler to wield authority of any sort. The princely state was extinguished and Tanjore annexed by the British as per the controversial Doctrine of Lapse when Shivaji died in 1855. However, Shivaji's adopted heir and his descendants have continued to live in the Tanjore palace and use the title "Chattrapathi" and  "Bhonsle Raja of Thanjavur" right up to the present day.
 The discovery in 2003, of Serfoji's medical prescriptions which contain an accurate description of eye-defects like cataracts and the operations to be performed  have created news worldwide. Serfoji is now universally recognized as one of the early pioneers of cataract lens removal surgery.

See also
 Bhonsle
 Maratha Empire
 List of Maratha dynasties and states
 Thanjavur Maratha kingdom

References 

 Raja Serfoji And Ophthalmology - A New Discovery
  Thanjavur Saraswathi Mahal Library
 https://web.archive.org/web/20070927003724/http://www.sarasvatimahallibrary.tn.nic.in/Thanjavur/Maratha_Rulers/body_maratha_rulers.html#serfoji2
 Raja Serfoji--Thanjavur's Maratha Legacy
 Restoration of Serfoji-era murals

External links
  — official website 
 List of Bhonsle Kings of Thanjavur

1777 births
1832 deaths
Maharajas of Thanjavur